Mikhail Viktorovich Koklyaev (born 17 December 1978) is a Russian weightlifter, strongman competitor, powerlifter and boxer. He is married and has two children.

Strongman
Koklyaev has placed third place at the Arnold Strongman Classic in 2006, 2008 and 2013, as well as second in 2009. He was a medalist of all three IFSA World Championships, finishing third in 2005, second in 2006 and second in 2007.

Koklyaev came in second place (with Igor Pedan) at the IFSA Strongman World 2-Man Championship, in Vilnius, Lithuania in 2007. He finished third at the 2010 World's Strongest Man contest, but failed to make the finals for the 2012 World's Strongest Man. Koklyaev qualified for the 2013 World's Strongest Man finals, but had to withdraw due to an earlier injury after the first event. He is a 7-time Strongman Champions League grand prix winner, and finished third overall for both the 2010 and 2012 SCL seasons.

Powerlifting/weightlifting
On 20 December 2008, Mikhail totalled 2,149 lbs at a raw powerlifting meet in Chelyabinsk, Russia with a  squat,  bench press, and a  deadlift.

Mikhail won the +125 kg class in the 2012 WPC Raw European Championships on 26 April 2012 with a  squat,  bench press, and a  deadlift.

On 16 December 2012, at the Chelyabinsk region championship, Mikhail had a raw squat of 360 kg (793 lbs), raw bench of 230 kg (507 lbs), and raw deadlift of 417.5 kg (920 lbs), making his raw total 1007.5 kg (2,221 lbs).

On Sunday 8 March at the 2009 Arnold Strongman Classic, Mikhail became only the second man in history to clean and jerk the famous 501 lb barbell used by Vasily Alekseyev in 1970.

Exhibition/ Seminar lifts
Mikhail successfully performed a 310 kg no hand squat during a seminar in Sydney following the GPA world powerlifting championships.
Mikhail has deadlifted 400 kg for 3 reps RAW as well as 362.5 kg for 9 dead-stop repetitions RAW.
Mikhail has jerked 270 kg overhead during a seminar in 2012.

Personal records

Weightlifting
Snatch: 
Clean and Jerk: 
Total: 

Powerlifting
Squat:  raw without knee wraps
Bench Press: 
Deadlift:  raw
Total:  (16 December 2012) raw without knee wraps

Combined lifting
 official weightlifting total + official powerlifting total = Combined Super Total:
460.0 kg + 1022.5 kg = 1482.5 kg =  3 268 lbs

Boxing
On 29 November 2019, Koklyaev made his debut as a professional boxer. He lost to Alexander Emelianenko by technical knockout in the first round. On February 20, 2021, at the Kings of the Ring tournament, Mikhail defeated blogger Artem Tarasov, known by the nickname "Cyclop", by a majority decision in a 4-round match.

References

External links
 Official site

Russian male weightlifters
Russian strength athletes
Russian powerlifters
1978 births
Living people
Sportspeople from Chelyabinsk